The June D Drake House is a historic house located in Silverton, Marion County, Oregon. It was listed on the National Register of Historic Places on March 12, 2011.

It was the Silverton home of June D Drake (1880-1969; Silverton Chamber of Commerce secretary, Knights of Pythias member, farmer, commercial photographer, and owner of Drake Brothers Studio in Silverton) and his wife Eleanor Mercedes Schoenfeld Drake (1880-1968).  He was a prime mover in the establishment of Silver Falls State Park.  Their house was deemed historically significant for listing on the National Register partly for its association with him and partly for it serving as a fine local example of "Free-Classic Queen Anne cottage" architecture.  It was the first house in Silverton to be electrified in 1904.

It is one of three houses in Silverton listed on the same day.

See also
Louis J. Adams House
Murton E. and Lillian DeGuire House

References

National Register of Historic Places in Marion County, Oregon
Silverton, Oregon
1904 establishments in Oregon
Houses in Marion County, Oregon